The Hull Jets is an ice hockey team playing in the NIHL 2 (North) as an affiliate of the National League Hull Pirates. Based in Kingston upon Hull, England, the Jets play their home games at Hull Arena.

Season-by-season record

Club roster 2020–21

2020/21 outgoing

References

Sport in Kingston upon Hull
Ice hockey teams in England
Ice hockey clubs established in 2013
2013 establishments in England